Eilsen is a Samtgemeinde ("collective municipality") in the district of Schaumburg, in Lower Saxony, Germany. Its seat is in the village Bad Eilsen.

The Samtgemeinde Eilsen consists of the following municipalities:
 Ahnsen
 Bad Eilsen
 Buchholz
 Heeßen
 Luhden

Samtgemeinden in Lower Saxony